Muhammad Ebrahim Khedri known as Pahlawan Ebrahim; (11 April 1938 – 22 May 2022) was an ethnic Hazara wrestler from Afghanistan, who competed at the 1960, 1964, 1968, and 1972 Summer Olympics in the featherweight events.

Early life 
Ebrahim Khedri was born on 11 April 1938 into a peasant family of Hazara ethnic group, in the Turkman Valley of Surkhi Parsa District, Parwan province. He moved with his family to Kabul as a child.

Death 
Ebrahim Khedri died on 22 May 2022 aged 84 in a hospital in Kabul, Afghanistan.

See also 
 List of Hazara people
 Wakil Hussain Allahdad

References

External links 
 
 

1938 births
2022 deaths
Wrestlers at the 1960 Summer Olympics
Wrestlers at the 1964 Summer Olympics
Wrestlers at the 1968 Summer Olympics
Wrestlers at the 1972 Summer Olympics
Afghan male sport wrestlers
Hazara sportspeople
Olympic wrestlers of Afghanistan
Sportspeople from Kabul
Asian Games medalists in wrestling
Wrestlers at the 1958 Asian Games
Wrestlers at the 1962 Asian Games
Asian Games bronze medalists for Afghanistan
Medalists at the 1962 Asian Games